Oyster River can refer to:

Rivers
 Oyster River (Connecticut), United States
 Oyster River (Maine), United States
 East Branch Oyster River
 West Branch Oyster River
 Oyster River (Minnesota), United States
 Oyster River (New Brunswick), Canada
 Oyster River (New Hampshire), United States

Places
 Oyster River, British Columbia, Canada
 Oyster River Plantation, a historic name of Durham, New Hampshire
 Oyster River Cooperative School District
 Oyster River High School, the local high school
 Oyster River Press, a local publisher
 Raid on Oyster River, a 1694 event